Johannes Chrishostomus "Kick" Smit (3 November 1911 – 1 July 1974) was a Dutch football player. He earned 29 caps and scored 26 goals for the Netherlands national football team, and played in the 1934 and 1938 World Cups. He is the first Netherlands football player who scored a goal in a World Cup (27 May 1934 against Switzerland). During his club career, he played for HFC Haarlem.

References

External links

1911 births
1974 deaths
People from Bloemendaal
Dutch footballers
Netherlands international footballers
HFC Haarlem players
1934 FIFA World Cup players
1938 FIFA World Cup players
Dutch football managers
HFC Haarlem managers
AZ Alkmaar managers
Association football forwards
Footballers from North Holland